Eizan is a Japanese name that may refer to:

 Eizan Cable, a Japanese railroad
 Eizan Electric Railway, a Japanese railway company
 Harukawa Eizan, an ukiyo-e artist active in the 1790s
 Kikukawa Eizan (1787–1867), an ukiyo-e artist